The Arab is an online English language magazine on Middle Eastern and North African current affairs, established as a print publication in 2007 and as an online only magazine in early 2009.

It focuses on a broad range of subject areas within the Arab world, from alternative viewpoints.  Articles are serious and authoritative in their approach, and aimed at readers with at least some familiarity with the region.

Its primary focus is politics and social affairs, but it also covers culture and business. Although it is concerned with Muslim-majority countries, it is not a Muslim magazine i.e. it does not publish articles from an Islamic perspective.  The Arab covers religious issues in the region from a secular angle.
The Arab is owned by an independent British publishing house of the same name, based in London.  It markets itself, however, as an international magazine on pan-Arab affairs.

References

 Gallagher, Rachael. "The Arab takes the politics out of Middle East" Press Gazette. 11 February 2008.
 "New pan-Arab magazine launched from London". Arab Media Watch. 7 February 2008.

2007 establishments in the United Kingdom
2009 disestablishments in the United Kingdom
Defunct political magazines published in the United Kingdom
Magazines established in 2007
Magazines disestablished in 2009
Magazines published in London
News magazines published in the United Kingdom
Online magazines published in the United Kingdom
Online magazines with defunct print editions